The Sara languages comprise over a dozen Bongo–Bagirmi languages spoken mainly in Chad; a few are also spoken in the north of the Central African Republic. They are members of the Central Sudanic language family. Greenberg (1966) treats all varieties as dialects of a Sara language, whereas Tucker and Bryan (1966) consider the Sara to be a dialect cluster of several languages. Most members of the different Sara languages/dialects consider their speech form distinct languages, but there is currently insufficient language information to determine which speech varieties need to be considered distinct languages, and which are dialects of other languages.

The most populous variety of Sara proper is Ngambay (Sara Ngambay), a major trade language of southern Chad, with about a million speakers, though Sar (Sara Madjingay) is the lingua franca of Sarh.

Names
The term "Sara Languages", sometimes called "Sara Proper Languages", is distinct from the so-called "Sara Kaba Languages". The latter include Sara Dunjo, Kaba Deme and Kaba Na. The term Sara itself is confusing, as within this family there exists a language named Sar, whose capital is Sarh. The term Kaba is likewise confusing. Kaba of Gore is not a Sara Kaba language, but rather a Sara language. Further, the Sara Kaba group includes a language named Sara Kaba

Languages

The Sara languages are:
West Sara
 Ngambay
 Laka
 Kabba
 Laka of Lau (spoken in Nigeria)
Central Sara (Doba)
 Bedjond
 Bebote
 Mango
 Gor
East Sara
 Sar
 Mbay
 Ngam
 Dagba
 Gulay
 Horo
The inclusion of Gulay with the Eastern Sara Languages is based on lexical comparison. Phonologically and morphologically Gulay behaves more like a Central Sara Language.

Boyeldieu (2006)
Boyeldieu (2006) classifies the Sara languages as follows.

Sara
Peripheral
Ndoka
Wad
Bagiro
Na
Tiye
Kulfa
Simé
'Dem
Central
Sar
Mbay
Ngambay
'Bedjond
Kaba P.
Others
Bulala
Beraku
Kenga
'Barma

Footnotes

References
Roger Blench (2012, ms)
Greenberg, Joseph H. (1966) The Languages of Africa (2nd ed. with additions and corrections). Bloomington: Indiana University.
Keegan, John M. (2012) Sara Languages Lexicon: French - Sara Languages, English - Sara Languages, Morkeg Books, Cuenca.

Tucker, A.N. and M.A. Bryan (1966) Linguistic Analyses: The Non-Bantu Languages of North-Eastern Africa. Published for the International African Institute. London/New York/Cape Town: Oxford University Press.

External links
PanAfriL10n page on Sara
Sara-Bagirmi Language Project

Bongo–Bagirmi languages
Languages of Chad
Sara people